Jerome Weber OSB (September 14, 1915 – September 4, 2008) was a Canadian abbot of the Roman Catholic Church.

Weber was born in Muenster, Saskatchewan, Canada in 1915 and ordained a priest on June 8, 1941 in the Order of Saint Benedict.  He was elected abbot of St. Peter-Muenster on April 6, 1960 and the election was confirmed on June 28, 1960. Abbot Jerome Weber retired from St. Peter-Muenster on June 15, 1990.

See also
Order of Saint Benedict

External links
Catholic-Hierarchy
Diocese site

Canadian abbots
1915 births
2008 deaths
Benedictine abbots
Canadian Benedictines